Taeromys is a genus of rodent in the family Muridae found exclusively in Sulawesi, Indonesia. 
It contains the following species:
 Salokko rat (Taeromys arcuatus)
 Lovely-haired rat (Taeromys callitrichus)
 Celebes rat (Taeromys celebensis)
 Sulawesi montane rat (Taeromys hamatus)
 Small-eared rat (Taeromys microbullatus)
 Sulawesi forest rat (Taeromys punicans)
 Tondano rat (Taeromys taerae)

References

 
Rodents of Sulawesi
Rodent genera
Taxonomy articles created by Polbot